Year 555 (DLV) was a common year starting on Friday (link will display the full calendar) of the Julian calendar. The denomination 555 for this year has been used since the early medieval period, when the Anno Domini calendar era became the prevalent method in Europe for naming years.

Events 
 By place 
 Byzantine Empire 
 By this date, the Roman Empire under Justinian I has reached its height. Justinian I has reconquered many former territories of the Western Roman Empire, including Italy, Dalmatia, Africa and Southern Hispania.
 An earthquake devastates the city of Latakia (modern Syria).

 Europe 
 King Chlothar I annexes the Frankish territories of Metz and Reims, after the death of his great-nephew Theudebald.

 Britain 
 King Erb of Gwent (in Southern Wales) dies; his kingdom is divided into Gwent and Ergyng (approximate date).

 Persia 
 Summer – Lazic War: The Byzantine army under Bessas is repulsed, and forced to retreat out of Archaeopolis (Georgia). 
 King Gubazes II is invited to observe the siege of a Persian-held fortress, and is murdered by the Byzantine military staff after accusing them of incompetence.

 Asia 
 Chinese Liang Dynasty: Jing Di, age 12, succeeds his father Yuan Di and is declared emperor by general Chen Baxian. 
 The Rouran Khaganate ends; it is defeated by the Göktürks under Muqan Qaghan, who expands his rule in Central Asia.

 By topic 
 Arts and sciences 
 Around this time, the historian Jordanes writes several books, among them De origine actibusque Getarum (The origin and deeds of the Goths).
 Taliesin, British poet, becomes court bard to King Brochwel of Powys (approximate date).

 Religion 
 June 7 – Pope Vigilius dies at Syracuse on his journey back home. His body is brought to Rome and buried in the San Martino ai Monti. 
 Cybi Felyn, abbot of Holyhead, dies at his monastery in Caer Gybi (approximate date).

Births 
 Basolus, French Benedictine and hermit (approximate date)
 Fatimah bint Asad, mother of Ali ibn Abi Talib (d. 626)
 Khadija, wife of Islamic prophet Muhammad (approximate date)

Deaths 
 January 27 – Yuan Di, emperor of the Liang Dynasty (b. 508)
 June 7 – Pope Vigilius
September/October - Gubazes II, king of Lazica (Georgia)
exact date unknown
Helier, Flemish-born hermit and patron saint of Jersey
Ly Thien Bao, emperor of Vietnam (b. 499) 
Theudebald, king of Austrasia 
Wang Sengbian, general of the Liang Dynasty
probable
Cybi Felyn, Cornish bishop 
Erb of Gwent, Welsh king

References

Sources